Debia is a genus of flowering plants in the family Rubiaceae. The genus is found from the Indian subcontinent to south-central China and the Philippines.

Species
Debia andamanica 
Debia krewanhensis 
Debia oligocephala 
Debia ovatifolia

References

Rubiaceae genera
Spermacoceae
Flora of the Philippines
Flora of China